Ab-e Garmu-ye Yek (also Romanized as Āb-e Garmū-ye Yek; also known as Āb-e Garm-e Pā’īn, Āb-e Garm Pā’īn, Āb-e Garmū, Ab Garm, and Ābgarm-e Pā’īn) is a village in Rud Ab-e Gharbi Rural District, Rud Ab District, Narmashir County, Kerman Province, Iran. At the 2006 census, its population was 36, in 11 families.

References 

Populated places in Narmashir County